Pundra University of Science & Technology (PUB) is a private university in Bogra, Bangladesh. The university was established in 2001 and obtained approval from UGC and Government of People's Republic of Bangladesh in 2002.

List of vice-chancellors 

 Prof. Dr. Md. Mozaffar Hossain ( present )

Facilities
Present facilities are shown as below:

 WiFi Campus
 Multimedia Class Rooms
 Modern Laboratory
 Residence (Male & Female)
 Transport
 Digital Library

Ongoing programs
 Faculty of Business Studies: Undergraduate: B.B.A. Post-graduate: M.B.A., E.M.B.A.
 Faculty of Science & Engineering: Undergraduate: B.Sc. in CSE, B.Sc. in EEE, B.Sc. in CE, and Post Graduate: MPH

Admission eligibility

Under graduate programs:
Minimum 2nd division or GPA 2.5 in both SSC and HSC or equivalent examinations of `O’ Level in five subjects and `A’ Level in two major subjects   with minimum `C’ in each or US high school diploma.

Graduate programs:
Minimum entry requirement for regular MBA (day and evening) program is a bachelor's degree from any discipline including engineering, agriculture or medicine etc.

Minimum entry requirement for regular EMBA (day and evening) program is a bachelor's degree from any discipline including engineering, agriculture or medicine etc. with 2 years of working experiences.

Accreditation
The academic programs of the university are recognized by the following organizations:
 University Grants Commission (Bangladesh) UGC   (University Grants Commission, Bangladesh)

Recognition of bachelor degrees

Bachelor's degrees of Pundra University are recognized by Bangladesh University of Engineering & Technology (BUET), the leading and one of the oldest universities in the public sector of Bangladesh, for pursuing M.Sc. courses offered by BUET. Bachelor's degrees of Pundra University are also recognized by RUET, CUET, KUET, DUET, DU,JU, RU, KU, CU, and SUST for pursuing M.Sc. courses.

Footnotes

External links
 

Educational institutions established in 2001
Private universities in Bangladesh
2001 establishments in Bangladesh